Vaithilingam Balachandran (born 18 December 1951) is a Sri Lankan Tamil politician and former Member of Parliament.

Balachandran was born on 18 December 1951. He is a Hindu.

Balachandran contested the 1994 parliamentary election as one of the Democratic People's Liberation Front's candidates in Vanni District and was elected to Parliament. He contested the 2001 and  2010 parliamentary elections as a DPLF candidate in Vanni District but failed to get elected on each occasion.

References

1951 births
Democratic People's Liberation Front politicians
Living people
Members of the 10th Parliament of Sri Lanka
People from Northern Province, Sri Lanka
Sri Lankan Hindus
Sri Lankan Tamil politicians